

Elimination round

Postseason

Phil
Volley
UAAP Season 58
UAAP volleyball tournaments